Lloyd Vernon "Chad" Chadburn DSO & Bar, DFC (21 August 1919 – 13 June 1944) was a Canadian World War II fighter pilot.

Biography

Birth
Lloyd Chadburn was born in Montreal, Quebec on 21 August 1919, later moving with his parents to Oshawa, Ontario as an infant. He grew up there and in Aurora. He worked as a bank clerk at the Bank of Toronto and as a salesman for the Red Rose Tea Company.

Career
Chadburn applied to enlist in both the Army and Navy in 1939, but was turned down both times. After a spell working for General Motors and with the Bank of Toronto, he was accepted by the Royal Canadian Air Force (RCAF) as an Air Gunner in April 1940, but re-mastered as a Pilot. He graduated from the Number 2 Flight Training School in Ottawa on 9 October 1940 as a Pilot Officer.

In December 1940 Chadburn was posted to Number 112 (Army Cooperation) Squadron flying Hawker Hurricanes and made his first operational flight in March 1941. He was posted to the United Kingdom in 1941, and joined 412 Squadron (RCAF) in June 1941, moving to 19 Squadron (RAF) in September.

In February 1942 Chadburn was posted to Number 416 (RCAF) Squadron in Peterhead, Scotland as a Flight Lieutenant. Days later he took over command of the squadron, becoming the first graduate of the British Commonwealth Air Training Plan to lead a Fighter Command squadron. He was also the youngest Squadron Leader in the RCAF at the age of 21.

Promoted to squadron leader, Chadburn and 416 Squadron flew defensive missions over Dieppe on 19 August 1942, covering the Canadian and Allied raid and claiming his first air victories. He was then awarded the Distinguished Flying Cross. After a period of leave in Canada, he was posted to No. 402 Squadron and then No. 403 Squadron, prior to his promotion to Wing Commander for the RAF Digby Wing in June 1943. He led the Wing in flying escort to American bombers and the RAF medium bombers of No. 2 Group. He was supposedly dubbed The Angel for his escort would assure the bomber crews a safe passage to and from the target. On 3 November 1943 the Wing claimed seven Bf 109's of II./JG 3 (five were actually lost), with Chadburn claiming two personally.

By the time Chadburn left the Digby Wing in December he had received the Distinguished Service Order twice, the first RCAF officer to be so decorated and was one of only four in history.  In early 1944, he was appointed Wing Commander, Fighter Operations at RCAF Group Headquarters Overseas. He was sent back to Canada for a War Bond drive in the spring and upon his return was made wing commander of Number 127 Wing RCAF, comprising 403, 421 and 416 Squadrons.

Death
On 13 June 1944, Chadburn was killed in a mid-air collision with another Spitfire pilot while taking off from a landing strip in Normandy. He was 24 years of age.

Honours
Chadburn's record includes five enemy airplanes destroyed (three shared), five aircraft probably destroyed (one shared), seven aircraft damaged (two shared), two E-boats destroyed, and another two damaged, as well as a destroyer damaged.

Chadburn was made a Chevalier (knight) in the French Légion d'honneur and awarded the Croix de Guerre avec Palme. Only three RCAF officers received the Légion d'honneur, and Chadburn was the only one to receive the Croix de Guerre.

His name is listed on the memorial in Northern Secondary school in Toronto Ontario which he attended.

Sources
Gone is the Angel - Biography of Lloyd Chadburn

References

External links
Canadian Aces - Lloyd Chadburn
Acesofww2 - "Chad"
 Resting place

1919 births
1944 deaths
Canadian World War II flying aces
Canadian Companions of the Distinguished Service Order
Military personnel from Montreal
Recipients of the Distinguished Flying Cross (United Kingdom)
Royal Canadian Air Force officers
Canadian military personnel killed in World War II
Royal Canadian Air Force personnel of World War II